The 1956 Davis Cup was the 45th edition of the Davis Cup, the most important tournament between national teams in men's tennis. 24 teams entered the Europe Zone, 5 teams entered the America Zone, and 3 teams entered the Eastern Zone.

The United States defeated Mexico in the America Zone final, India defeated Japan in the Eastern Zone final, and Italy defeated Sweden in the Europe Zone final. In the Inter-Zonal Zone, the United States defeated Italy in the semifinal, and then defeated India in the final. In the Challenge Round the United States were defeated by defending champions Australia. The final was played at Memorial Drive in Adelaide, Australia on 26–28 December.

America Zone

Draw

Final
United States vs. Mexico

Eastern Zone

Draw

Final
Japan vs. India

Europe Zone

Draw

Final
Sweden vs. Italy

Inter-Zonal Zone

Draw

Semifinals
United States vs. Italy

United States vs. India

Challenge Round
Australia vs. United States

References

External links
Davis Cup official website

 
Davis Cups by year
Davis Cup
Davis Cup
Davis Cup
Davis Cup
Davis Cup